The Rural Municipality of Surprise Valley No. 9 is a rural municipality (RM) in the Canadian province of Saskatchewan within Census Division No. 2 and  Division No. 2. Located in the southeast portion of the province, it is adjacent to the United States border, neighbouring Sheridan County in Montana.

History 
The RM of Surprise Valley No. 9 incorporated as a rural municipality on January 1, 1913.

Geography

Communities and localities 
The following urban municipalities are surrounded by the RM.

Villages
Minton

The following unincorporated communities are within the RM.

Localities
Gladmar (dissolved as a village)
Regway
Sybouts

Demographics 

Government 
The RM of Surprise Valley No. 9 is governed by an elected municipal council and an appointed administrator that meets on the second Thursday of every month. The reeve of the RM is Herb Axten while its administrator is Loran Tessier. The RM's office is located in Minton.

See also 
List of rural municipalities in Saskatchewan

References 

Surprise Valley
Division No. 2, Saskatchewan